The following lists events that happened during 1957 in South Africa.

Incumbents
 Monarch: Queen Elizabeth II.
 Governor-General and High Commissioner for Southern Africa: Ernest George Jansen.
 Prime Minister: Johannes Gerhardus Strijdom.
 Chief Justice: Albert van der Sandt Centlivres then Henry Allan Fagan.

Events
January
 30 – The General Assembly of the United Nations calls on South Africa to reconsider its apartheid policy.

May
 2 – Die Stem van Suid-Afrika, written by Cornelis Jacobus Langenhoven, becomes the official National Anthem

December 
 16 – The 45th Annual Conference of the African National Congress is held in Orlando, Johannesburg.
 A series of shark attacks near Durban occur during Black December.

Unknown date
 The United States and South Africa sign a nuclear cooperation agreement in terms of which the United States will provide South Africa with a nuclear research reactor and supply enriched uranium as fuel, as well as trained additional scientists and reactor technicians.

Births
 7 January – Ivan Glasenberg, billionaire businessman.
 23 March – Edna Molewa, politician.
 26 May – Dan Roodt, activist, author and politician.
  June – Peter de Villiers, Springboks coach.
 14 September; Kepler Wessels, cricketer.

Deaths
 23 April – Roy Campbell, poet and satirist. (b. 1901)
 14 November – Jacobus Hendrik Pierneef, landscape artist. (b. 1886)
 10 December – James Stevenson-Hamilton, first warden of the Kruger National Park. (b. 1867)

Railways

Locomotives
 The South African Railways places the first of forty-five Class 5E,  electric locomotives in mainline service.

References

History of South Africa